Ralph Ramsey Watson (20 January 1936 – 20 June 2021) was a British actor. His TV credits include Z-Cars, Dixon of Dock Green, Doctor Who (in the serials The Underwater Menace,  The Web of Fear, The Monster of Peladon and Horror of Fang Rock), Porridge, Auf Wiedersehen, Pet, The Bill, Agatha Christie's Poirot and Casualty. He died in June 2021 at the age of 85.

Filmography

References

External links
 

1936 births
2021 deaths
English male stage actors
English male television actors
Male actors from Newcastle upon Tyne